Allwright is an English language surname. Notable people with the surname include:

 Charles Allwright (1888–1966), English footballer
 Charles Allwright (1902–1978), English table tennis player
 Graeme Allwright (1926-2020), New Zealand-French singer/songwriter
 Harry Allwright (1837–1892), New Zealand politician
 Joel Allwright (born 1988), Australian footballer
 Matt Allwright, English television presenter

See also

References 

Surnames of Old English origin